America's Sweetheart is a musical comedy with music by Richard Rodgers, lyrics by Lorenz Hart and book by Herbert Fields.

Production
America's Sweetheart premiered on Broadway at the Broadhurst Theatre on February 10, 1931, and closed on June 6, 1931, after 135 performances.  It was produced by Laurence Schwab and Frank Mandel, directed by Monty Woolley, with choreography and production supervision by Bobby Connolly, with set design by Donald Oenslager and costume design by Charles Le Maire. The show starred Jack Whiting, Ann Sothern (using her real name Harriet Lake), Inez Courtney, and Virginia Bruce.

The show is a Hollywood satire. Two young lovers hitchhike to Hollywood to make their fortune. The girl hits it big and loses interest in her boyfriend, who hasn't fared as well. Later, the introduction of talking pictures reverses their fortunes, and the boyfriend's career eclipses the girlfriend's, but they make up.

Songs

Act 1 
"Mr. Dolan Is Passing Through" (S. A. Dolan, Executives and Ensemble) 
"In Califor-n-i-a" (Dorith, Paula and Movie Actresses) 
"My Sweet" (Madge Farrell and Larry Pitkin) 
"I've Got Five Dollars" (Geraldine March and Michael Perry)
"I've Got Five Dollars (Reprise)" (Geraldine March and Michael Perry) 
"Sweet Geraldine" (Georgia, Georgiana and Georgette) 
"There's So Much More" (Denise Torel and Larry Pitkin) 
"We'll Be the Same" (Geraldine March, Michael Perry and Ensemble) 
"We'll Be the Same (Reprise)" (Michael Perry and Larry Pitkin) 
"How About It" (Madge Farrell and Michael Perry) 
"Innocent Chorus Girls of Yesterday" (Movie Stars) 
"A Lady Must Live" (Denise Torel)

Act 2 
"You Ain't Got No Savoir Faire" (Madge Farrell and Larry Pitkin) 
"Two Unfortunate Orphans" (Paula, Dorith and Ensemble) 
"I Want a Man" (Denise Torel) 
"Tennessee Dan" (Georgia, Georgiana and Georgette) 
"How About It (Reprise)" (Denise Torel, Michael Perry, Larry Pitkin and Ensemble)
"Reprise - Finale" (Geraldine and Michael)

Cast

External links 
 Internet Broadway Database listing
  Overview of show

References 

1931 musicals
Broadway musicals
Original musicals
Musicals by Rodgers and Hart
Musicals by Herbert Fields